Stevan James Arnold (born 11 October 1944) is an American evolutionary biologist. He is Professor Emeritus of Integrative Biology and Curator of Amphibians and Reptiles at Oregon State University, Corvallis. He has served as president of the Society for the Study of Evolution and the American Society of Naturalists.

Arnold was elected a fellow of the Animal Behavior Society in 1992 and a fellow of the American Academy of Arts and Sciences in 2009. He has published over 150 peer-reviewed articles.

Early life and education 
Arnold was born in Baltimore, Maryland, on 11 October 1944, and grew up in southern California. He enrolled at the University of California, Berkeley in 1962, declared a major in Zoology and immediately began working in the herpetology laboratory at the Museum of Vertebrate Zoology, under the supervision of Robert C. Stebbins. Graduating from Berkeley in 1966, he took the Organization for Tropical Studies ecology course that summer and began graduate school at the University of Michigan in the fall. He studied the evolution of courtship behavior in salamanders for his doctoral dissertation, supervised by Arnold G. Kluge.

In 1971, he moved back to Berkeley to begin a Miller Postdoctoral Fellowship with David B. Wake, launching a new research program on the behavioral ecology of garter snakes.

He is the brother of former baseball player Christopher Paul Arnold.

Career 
Arnold joined the faculty of the University of California, Santa Barbara in 1973. A year later he moved to the University of Chicago, where he was a faculty member for the next 23 years. During this period, he was especially influenced by his colleagues Michael J. Wade and Russell Lande as his interests moved in the direction of evolutionary quantitative genetics. Those interests continued to develop after he moved to Oregon State University in 1997 as chair of the Department of Zoology. That administrative work ended in 2002, and he became curator of the amphibians and reptiles in the Oregon State Natural History Collections.

Arnold served as the President of Society for the Study of Evolution in 1998, and of the American Society of Naturalists in 2012. He has been the Co-chair of OSU research collections since 1997, where he oversees and supervises research collections at OSU.

Arnold was an Associate Editor of Evolution from 1981 to 1983 and of Theoretical Population Biology from 1988 to 1991. From 2004 to 2009, he was the Director of Oregon State Arthropod Collection.

Work 
Arnold's work has been mainly focused in the field of evolutionary quantitative genetics, specifically on evolution of phenotypic traits (body size, morphology, behavior, whole organismal performance) that are affected by many genes. Arnold has also made key contributions to the understanding of how polygenic mutation and inheritance evolve.

Arnold has developed a variety of quantitative methods in evolutionary quantitative genetics. In 1983, he co-authored 'The Measurement of Selection on Correlated Characters', with Russell Lande. The paper has been cited over 4000 times. He has also developed novel methods to characterize behavioral variation in natural populations, visualize selection surfaces, mathematically characterize mating systems, estimate and interpret sexual isolation, compare inheritance matrices, understand the evolution of quantitative inheritance,  and analyze the process of adaptive radiation.

Awards and honors 
1981-1986 - NIH Research Career Development Award
1992 - Distinguished Herpetologist, Herpetologists League
1992 - Fellow, Animal Behavior Society
1992 -	Walton Lecture, Mountain Lake Biological Station
1993 -	Vice President, American Society of Naturalists
1995 -	Fellows Lecture, Animal Behavior Society
1996 - Pettingill Lecture, University of Michigan
2003 - Donald W. Tinkle Memorial Lecture, University of Michigan
2003 -	Distinguished Ecologist Lectures, Kellogg Biological Station
2005 - Gilfillan Memorial Award for Distinguished Scholarship in Science, Oregon State University
2008 - Henry S. Fitch Award for Excellence in Herpetology, American Society of Ichthyologists and Herpetologists
2009 - Fellow, American Academy of Arts & Sciences

Selected articles 
Wade, M., & Arnold, S. J. (1980). The intensity of sexual selection in relation to male sexual behaviour, female choice, and sperm precedence. Animal Behaviour, 28(2), 446–461.
Arnold, S. J. (1983). Morphology, Performance and Fitness. American Zoologist, 23(2), 347–361.
Lande, R., & Arnold, S. J. (1983). The Measurement of Selection on Correlated Characters. Evolution, 37(6), 1210–1226.
Arnold, S. J., & Wade, M. J. (1984). On the Measurement of Natural and Sexual Selection: Theory. Evolution, 38(4), 709–719.
Price, T., Kirkpatrick, M., & Arnold, S. J. (1988). Directional selection and the evolution of breeding date in birds. Science, 240(4853), 798–799.
Huey, R. B., Peterson, C. R., Arnold, S. J., & Porter, W. P. (1989). Hot Rocks and Not-So-Hot Rocks: Retreat-Site Selection by Garter Snakes and Its Thermal Consequences. Ecology, 70(4), 931–944.
Phillips, P., & Arnold, S. (1989). Visualizing Multivariate Selection. Evolution, 43(6), 1209–1222.
Arnold, S. J. (1992). Constraints on Phenotypic Evolution. The American Naturalist, 140, S85-S107
Arnold, S. J., & Duvall, D. (1994). Animal Mating Systems: A Synthesis Based on Selection Theory. The American Naturalist, 143(2), 317–348.

References 

Living people
UC Berkeley College of Letters and Science alumni
Oregon State University faculty
1944 births
Evolutionary biologists
University of Michigan alumni